The TVB Anniversary Award for Best Actor in a Leading Role is one of the TVB Anniversary Awards presented annually by Television Broadcasts Limited (TVB) to recognize an actor who has delivered an outstanding performance in Hong Kong television dramas throughout the designated year. This award is usually reserved to be one of the last awards presented, and is one of the most premier and publicized awards of the ceremony. An actor who wins Best Actor is referred to as the TV King (視帝).

Since its institution in 1997, the award has changed names several times. It was first called Best Performance by an Actor in a Drama (最佳劇中男角演繹大獎) in 1997, but was changed to Best Actor in a Leading Role (最佳男主角) in 1998. In 1999, the name was changed to My Favourite Leading Actor of the Year (本年度我最喜愛的男主角). The name was changed back to "Best Actor in a Leading Role" in 2005.

Winners and nominees
TVB nominates at least ten actors for the category each year. The following table lists only the actors who have made it to the top five nominations during the designated awards ceremony.

1990s

2000s

2010s

2020s

Records

Most wins

Most top 5 nominations

Age superlatives

External links
Anniversary Awards  myTV SUPER

Television awards for Best Actor
TVB Anniversary Awards